Långedrag is a district in Gothenburg, Sweden.

References 

Gothenburg